Alana Nicole O'Neill (born July 13, 1996) is an American soccer player who plays for Swiss club FC Zürich Frauen as a defender.

External links 
 
 Instagram

References 

1996 births
Living people
American women's soccer players
Sportspeople from New York (state)
Women's association football defenders
Syracuse Orange women's soccer players
Campeonato Nacional de Futebol Feminino players
S.L. Benfica (women) footballers
Expatriate women's footballers in Portugal
21st-century American women
FF Lugano 1976 players
Swiss Women's Super League players
FC Zürich Frauen players
Expatriate women's footballers in Switzerland
American expatriate sportspeople in Portugal
American expatriate sportspeople in Switzerland